Yonyou (officially Yonyou Network Technology Co., Ltd., formerly yonyou Software Co., Ltd.) is principally engaged in the development and distribution of enterprise management software and cloud services. 

Yonyou has around 230 branches worldwide, including Mainland China, Singapore, Macau, Hong Kong, Malaysia, Taiwan, Thailand and Indonesia.

Products
Yonyou provides enterprise cloud services and management software Enterprise Resource Planning (ERP) including Supply Chain Management (SCM), Customer Relationship Management (CRM), Human Resources (HR), Business Intelligence (BI), Office Automation (OA), Financial Management (FMS), etc. It also offers industry-wide solutions for retail, education, F&B, finance, construction, public organization and so on.

Market share
Annual market reports from independent research firms, IDC and CCID Consulting, ranked Yonyou as China's No. 1 management solution provider over the past five years consecutively. 

Yonyou Network Technology announced its financial results for 2021. Gross revenue amounted to RMB 8.932 billion (USD$1.404 billion). Revenue from cloud services (excluding financial cloud services) amounted to RMB 5.321 billion (USD$836 million), up 55.5% year-on-year.

According to "Market Share Analysis: ERP Software, Worldwide, 2019 - By Gartner", Yonyou is one of the top ten vendors in ERP software.

See also
Software industry in China
China Software Industry Association

References

Companies based in Beijing
Software companies established in 1988
Chinese companies established in 1988
Business software companies
Customer relationship management software companies
ERP software companies
Human resource management software
Supply chain software companies
Software companies of China
Privately held companies of China
Chinese brands